Yenişehir is one of Diyarbakır's central district in Turkey.

References 

Districts of Diyarbakır Province
Kurdish settlements in Turkey